The Hermannsweg is a  long hiking trail which follows the ridge of the Teutoburg Forest, running from Rheine to Velmerstot in Germany. It is marked by signposts showing a white H on a black background. The Hermannsweg has been named for Arminius (German name: Hermann), a Cherusci chief who defeated the Romans in the Battle of the Teutoburg Forest in 9 AD. It is maintained by the Teutoburger-Wald-Verein e.V. located in Bielefeld.

History 
As shown by findings of flint tools, parts of the way on the ridge of the Teutoburg Forest have been used by hunter-gatherers and traders since the Mesolithic period. In the Middle Ages, the Hermannsweg connected the surrounding areas to travelling and trading routes of interegional importance like the Westphalian Hellweg and the Frankfurter Weg. The hiking trail has officially been established in 1902, 25 years after the construction of the Hermannsdenkmal near Detmold, which commemorates the Cheruscan victory over the Romans in 9 AD.

The Route 

References

External links 

Hiking trails in Germany